Sardar Raza Muhammad Barrech is a Pakistani politician who was a Member of the Provincial Assembly of Balochistan, from May 2013 to May 2018.

Early life and education
He was born on 19 April 1941 in Quetta.

He has a degree in Master of Arts and a degree in the Bachelors of Laws.

Political career

He was elected to the Provincial Assembly of Balochistan as a candidate of Pashtunkhwa Milli Awami Party from Constituency PB-4 Quetta-IV in 2013 Pakistani general election.

References

Living people
Balochistan MPAs 2013–2018
1941 births